Le Rochail is a mountain in the French Alps.

Mountains of the Alps
Alpine three-thousanders
Mountains of Isère